Girl Geek Dinners is an informal organisation that promotes women in the information technology industry, with 64 established chapters in 23 countries. The organization was founded in London, United Kingdom, by Sarah Lamb (née Blow), who realized how under-represented women are at information technology events after attending a Geek Dinner in 2005.

Chapters organise local events featuring both female and male speakers with mostly female attendees. As the name suggests, it is like a Geek Dinner but with one significant rule: men can only attend as invited guests of women, ensuring that women will never be outnumbered by men at events.

A typical event is an informal dinner, followed by one or more presentations by featured speakers.

Chapters
Girl Geeks Scotland (GGD)
Bay Area Girl Geek Dinners (BAGGD)
 Girl Geek Dinners Sydney
Reading Girl Geek Dinners (RGGD)
Girl Geekdinners Berlin (ggdb)
Manchester Girl Geeks (mgg)
Girl Geek Dinners Milano (GGD MI)
Girl Geek Dinners Nordest (GGDNE - Italy)
Bath Girl Geek Dinners (UK)
Bristol Girl Geek Dinners (UK)
Girl Geek Dinners Oslo (Norway)
Girl Geek Dinners Bergen (Norway)
Girl Geek Dinners Kristiansand (Norway)
Girl Geek Dinners (Boulder/Denver)
Boston Girl Geek Dinners
Zurich Girl Geek Dinners
Girl Geek Dinners Waterloo Region
Girl Geek Dinner NL (Amsterdam)
Austin Girl Geek Dinners
Girl Geek Dinners Cagliari 
Belgian Girl Geeks
Seattle Geek Girl Dinners

See also
 Women in computing

References

External links

Girl Geek Dinners
Short documentary about Girl Geekdinners

Information technology organisations based in the United Kingdom
International women's organizations
Nerd culture
Organizations established in 2005
Organizations for women in science and technology
Women's organisations based in the United Kingdom